Ravilla S. Munirathinam is an Indian politician and former Member of the Legislative Assembly of Tamil Nadu. He was elected to the Tamil Nadu legislative assembly from Gummidipundi constituency as an Anna Dravida Munnetra Kazhagam candidate in 1977, 1980, and 1984 elections. He is the founder of the RMK Group of Educational Institutions, which constitutes the major engineering colleges RMK Engineering College, RMD Engineering College and RMK College of Engineering and Technology  resided at Kavaraipettai.They also run a  residential school affiliated to the CBSE and Sri durgadevi polytechnic college. They have also established a day school in the name of RMK School at Thiruverkadu near Chennai.

Electoral performance

References 

All India Anna Dravida Munnetra Kazhagam politicians
Living people
Year of birth missing (living people)
Tamil Nadu MLAs 1977–1980
Tamil Nadu MLAs 1980–1984
Tamil Nadu MLAs 1985–1989